Dmytro Kanivets (born 22 August 1991) is a Ukrainian judoka.

He is the gold medallist of the 2016 Judo Grand Prix Zagreb in the -73 kg category.

References

External links
 

1991 births
Living people
Ukrainian male judoka
Universiade medalists in judo
Universiade silver medalists for Ukraine
Universiade bronze medalists for Ukraine
Medalists at the 2015 Summer Universiade
European Games competitors for Ukraine
Judoka at the 2019 European Games
21st-century Ukrainian people